Saint Boniface is the Roman Catholic church in Stadtheide, a quarter of the German city Paderborn which belongs to the Deanship of Paderborn in Archiocese of Paderborn.

History 
The church is still very young: The history of this church starts in 1919.

After World War II the building was damaged and needed building repairs. As a consequence of the increased member numbers, it was decided to build a new building and pull down the old one.

The architect Johannes Schilling from Cologne was charged with the organisation of the new building. The new church was consecrated by the Archbishop of Paderborn Johannes Joachim Degenhardt on 6 June 1981.

After the church itself and the Kindergarten Saint Boniface were built, a Pfarrheim was added. This building was finished in 1988.

Since 2004 the church is administrated together with the churches Saint Heinrich and Saint Stephanus in Paderborn. This administrative unit of three churches is named Pastoralverbund Paderborn Nord-Ost. In future it is planned to add three more churches to the Pastoralverbund.

Groups and organisations 
The church has an own youth organisation, the Bonijugend. This organisation organises activities for children at the age of 9+ years and helps with events of the church. In addition to that there is a camp of tents every year in the first two weeks of the summer holidays in North Rhine-Westphalia which takes place in the Sauerland and is very popular with the kids in the Stadtheide.

References

External links 
 Web site of the Church Saint Boniface in Paderborn (German)
 Web site of the Bonijugend - the Catholic youth organisation in Saint Boniface

Paderborn
Buildings and structures in Paderborn (district)
Roman Catholic churches in North Rhine-Westphalia
20th-century Roman Catholic church buildings in Germany
Roman Catholic churches completed in 1988